The 2021 season saw Southern Vipers compete in the 50 over Rachael Heyhoe Flint Trophy, of which they were defending champions, and the new Twenty20 competition, the Charlotte Edwards Cup. The side topped the group stage of the Rachael Heyhoe Flint Trophy, winning six of their seven matches and therefore progressing straight to the final. In the final they faced Northern Diamonds, who made 183 batting first. In response, Vipers were reduced to 109/7, but an unbroken partnership of 78 between Emily Windsor and Tara Norris ensured the side defended their title, winning by 3 wickets with 2 balls to spare.

In the Charlotte Edwards Cup, the side finished second in Group A, winning four of their six matches, to progress to the semi-final as the best runner-up in the group stage. There, they played Northern Diamonds, who made 135/6 batting first. In response, Vipers were bowled out for 117 in 20 overs and were therefore eliminated from the competition.
 
The side was captained by Georgia Adams and coached by Charlotte Edwards. They played three home matches at the Rose Bowl, two at the County Ground, Hove and one at Arundel Castle Cricket Ground.

Squad
Southern Vipers announced their initial 18-player squad on 18 May 2021. Sophie Mitchelmore, Chiara Green and Abbie Whybrow were added to the squad on 28 August 2021. Gaby Lewis was signed as an overseas player for the remainder of the season on 9 September 2021. Age given is at the start of Southern Vipers' first match of the season (29 May 2021).

Rachael Heyhoe Flint Trophy

Season standings

 Advanced to the final
 Advanced to the play-off

Fixtures

Final

Tournament statistics

Batting

Source: ESPN Cricinfo Qualification: 100 runs.

Bowling

Source: ESPN Cricinfo Qualification: 5 wickets.

Charlotte Edwards Cup

Group A

 Advanced to the final
 Advanced to the semi-final

Fixtures

Semi-final

Tournament statistics

Batting

Source: ESPN Cricinfo Qualification: 50 runs.

Bowling

Source: ESPN Cricinfo Qualification: 5 wickets.

Season statistics

Batting

Bowling

Fielding

Wicket-keeping

References

Southern Vipers seasons
2021 in English women's cricket